Rho guanine nucleotide exchange factor 12 is a protein that in humans is encoded by the ARHGEF12 gene. This protein is also called RhoGEF12 or Leukemia-associated Rho guanine nucleotide exchange factor (LARG).

Function 
Rho guanine nucleotide exchange factor 12 is guanine nucleotide exchange factor (GEF) for the RhoA small GTPase protein.  Rho is a small GTPase protein that is inactive when bound to the guanine nucleotide GDP. But when acted on by Rho GEF proteins such as RhoGEF1, this GDP is released and replaced by GTP, leading to the active state of Rho. In this active, GTP-bound conformation, Rho can bind to and activate specific effector proteins and enzymes to regulate cellular functions. In particular, active Rho is a major regulator of the cell actin cytoskeleton.

RhoGEF12 is a member of a group of four RhoGEF proteins known to be activated by G protein coupled receptors coupled to the  G12 and G13 heterotrimeric G proteins. The others are ARHGEF1 (also known as p115-RhoGEF), ARHGEF11 (also known as PDZ-RhoGEF) and AKAP13 (also known as ARHGEF13 and Lbc).  GPCR-regulated RhoGEF12 (and these related GEF proteins) acts as an effector for G12 and G13 G proteins. In addition to being activated by G12 or G13 G proteins, three of these four RhoGEF proteins (ARHGEF1/11/12) also function as RGS family GTPase-activating proteins (GAPs) to increase the rate of GTP hydrolysis of G12/G13 alpha proteins (which are themselves GTPase proteins). This action increases the rate of G protein deactivation, limiting the time during which these RhoGEFs activate Rho.

Clinical significance 
This protein is observed to form myeloid/lymphoid fusion partner in acute myeloid leukemia.

Interactions 

ARHGEF12 has been shown to interact with:

 GNA12, 
 GNA13, 
 IGF1R, 
 PLXNB1, 
 RHOA, and
 TEC.

See also 
 Second messenger system
 G protein-coupled receptor
 Heterotrimeric G protein
 Small GTPases
 Rho family of GTPases

References

Further reading

External links